The Championnat de France de water-polo is the premier category in the league system for water polo clubs in France. The men's championship was founded in 1896 by the French Athletic Sports Societies Union. Since 1921 the competition is organized by the newly founded French Swimming Federation. In 1983 the women's championship was founded. 

Enfants de Neptune de Tourcoing and ASPTT Nancy are the most successful team in the  championships with 46 and 13 titles, most recently in 1964 and 2008. On the other hand CN Marseille and Olympic Nice have been the leading teams in recent years. The men's 1956 and 1971 editions were declared vacant.

List of champions

Men's championship
 Enfants de Neptune de Tourcoing (46)
 1909, 1910, 1911, 1912, 1913, 1914, 1915, 1916, 1917, 1918, 1919, 1920, 1921, 1922, 1923, 1925, 1926, 1927, 1928, 1929, 1930, 1931, 1932, 1933, 1934, 1935, 1936, 1937, 1938, 1939, 1940, 1941, 1942, 1943, 1944, 1945, 1946, 1947, 1948, 1949, 1950, 1952, 1953, 1954, 1957, 1964
 CN Marseille (36)
 1965, 1966, 1967, 1968, 1969, 1970, 1973, 1974, 1975, 1976, 1977, 1978, 1979, 1980, 1981, 1982, 1983, 1984, 1985, 1986, 1987, 1988, 1989, 1990, 1991, 1996, 2005, 2006, 2007, 2008, 2009, 2010, 2011, 2013, 2015, 2016
 Olympic Nice (8)
 1997, 1998, 1999, 2000, 2001, 2002, 2003, 2004
 SN Strasbourg (7)
 1958, 1959, 1960, 1961, 1963, 2018, 2019
 Libellule de Paris (5)
 1902, 1903, 1904, 1907, 1924
 Cacel Nice (4)
 1992, 1993, 1994, 1995
 Pupilles de Neptune (3)
 1896, 1900, 1901
 CA Paris (3)
 1905, 1906, 1908 
 Racing Club de France
 1951, 1955
 Montpellier Water Polo
 2012, 2014
 SCN Choisy-le-Rei
 1962
 Pélican Club Valenciennes
 1972

Women's championship
 ASPTT Nancy
 1994, 1995, 1996, 1997, 1998, 2000, 2001, 2002, 2003, 2004, 2005, 2006, 2008
 Dauphins de Créteil
 1986, 1987, 1988, 1989, 1990, 1991, 1992, 1993
 Olympic Nice
 2007, 2009, 2010, 2011, 2012, 2012
 Racing Club de France
 1983, 1984, 1985

Current teams

2022-23 Men's championship
 Dauphins de Sète
 Lille
 Marseille
 Montpellier
 Olympic Nice
 Noisy-le-Sec
 Pays d'Aix
 Reims
 Strasbourg

2011-12 Women's championship
 Choisy-le-Roi
 Lille
 Nancy
 Olympic Nice
 St. Bruno
 St. Jean d'Angély
 Strasbourg

References

1
Fra
Sports leagues in France
Professional sports leagues in France